Ablepharus sikimmensis (common name: Sikkim ground skink or bronzy-brown skink) is a species of skink found in Bangladesh (Rangpur), Bhutan, China (Tibet), India (Darjeeling, Sikkim) and Nepal.

References

 Blyth, E. 1854 Notices and descriptions of various reptiles, new or little-known. Part I. J. Asiat. Soc. Bengal  22 [1853]: 639-655
 Günther, A. 1860 Contributions to a knowledge of the reptiles of the Himalaya mountains. - I. Descriptions of the new species. II. List of Himalayan reptiles, with remarks on their horizontal distribution. Proc. Zool. Soc. London 1860: 148-175
 Ouboter, P.E. 1986 A revision of the genus Scincella (Reptilia: Sauria: Scincidae) of Asia, with some notes on its evolution. Zoologische Verhandelingen (Leiden) (No. 229) 1986: 1-66 PDF
 Stoliczka, F. 1871 Notes on new or little-known Indian lizards. Proc. asiat. Soc. Bengal (Calcutta) 1871: 192-195

Ablepharus
Reptiles of Bangladesh
Reptiles of Bhutan
Reptiles of China
Reptiles of India
Reptiles of Nepal
Fauna of Tibet
Taxa named by Edward Blyth
Reptiles described in 1854